The Compagnie du chemin de fer de Paris à Orléans (PO) was an early French railway company.

It merged with the Chemins de fer du Midi to form the Chemins de fer de Paris à Orléans et du Midi (PO-Midi) in 1934. In 1938 the PO-Midi was nationalized with five other companies to become a part of the Société nationale des chemins de fer français (SNCF).

History

Beginnings as railway company 
The company was founded on 13 August 1838 under the name Compagnie du chemin de fer de Paris à Orléans (PO). It had the right to form a limited company and was equipped with a starting capital of 40 million francs. In addition, the company had one of the French government's awarded temporary concession of 70 years, to build and operate a railway between the cities of Paris and Orléans. It had its headquarters in Paris. The first president of the board was François Bartholony.

The first operation of the line dated 20 September 1840, but it only reached to Corbeil via Juvisy. The line reached Orléans on 2 May 1843.

First merger 
In March 1852, with government support, Compagnie du chemin de fer de Paris à Orléans took over some companies.  These were:

Compagnie du Centre
Compagnie du chemin de fer de Tours à Nantes
Compagnie du chemin de fer d'Orléans à Bordeaux

In 1853 it took over the Compagnie du chemin de fer de Paris à Sceaux.

With those mergers, the Compagnie du chemin de fer de Paris à Orléans had almost reached its final extent.

From 1852 to 1934, it was the second largest French private railway. From the Gare d'Austerlitz, the network extended over the territory from the Loire and Garonne to Orléans and Tours. From there, the branches led to Vendôme, Le Mans, the Atlantic coast of Angers, Nantes, St Nazaire to Landerneau, south of Villefranche, Clermont-Ferrand and Toulouse, south-west of Poitiers and Angoulême to Bordeaux.

Network in 1912

Second merger and nationalization
In 1934, Compagnie du chemin de fer de Paris à Orléans (PO) was merged with the Chemin de Fer du Midi into Chemin de Fer de Paris à Orléans et du Midi (PO-Midi)". After the merger, the new PO-Midi's network was almost .

To create an efficient, uniform and nationwide network under state control, on 1 January 1938, it was nationalized with five other companies to become a part of the newly founded Société nationale des chemins de fer français (SNCF). Then this also took on more rail activities of five other companies.

Legacy

After the Second World War, the banking family Rothschild family took over the remains of the Paris Orléans and transformed it into a holding company for its banking activities and corporate investments.

References

Literature

 
Railway companies of France

de:Paris-Orléans